Neocalyptis telutanda is a species of moth of the family Tortricidae. It is found on Java in Indonesia.

References

	

Moths described in 1941
Neocalyptis